A general election was held in the U.S. state of Arkansas on November 6, 2018. All of Arkansas' executive officers were up for election as well as all of Arkansas' four seats in the United States House of Representatives. Primaries were held on May 22, 2018. Polls were open from 7:30 AM to 7:30 PM CST. Republicans retained of all statewide offices and all four seats in the United States House of Representatives.

Governor

Republican Governor Asa Hutchinson was elected to a second term.

Lieutenant Governor
Republican Lieutenant Governor Tim Griffin was elected to a second term.

Attorney General
Republican Attorney General Leslie Rutledge was elected to a second term.

Secretary of State
Republican John Thurston was elected to a first term.

State Treasurer
Republican Treasurer Dennis Milligan was elected to a second term.

State Auditor
Republican Andrea Lea was elected to a second term.

Commissioner of State Lands
Incumbent Commissioner of State Lands John Thurston (R) was term-limited and could not run for re-election. He successfully won his race as Secretary of State of Arkansas. Republican Tommy Land was elected to a first term.

United States House of Representatives

All of Arkansas' four seats in the United States House of Representatives were up for election in 2018. Republicans held on to all four seats.

References

External links
Candidates at Vote Smart 
Candidates at Ballotpedia
Campaign finance at OpenSecrets

Official Lieutenant Governor campaign websites
Anthony Bland (D) for Lt. Governor
Tim Griffin (R) for Lt. Governor

Official Attorney General campaign websites
Mike Lee (D) for Attorney General 
Leslie Rutledge (R) for Attorney General

Official Secretary of State campaign websites
Susan Inman (D) for Secretary of State 
John Thurston (R) for Secretary of State

Official State Treasurer campaign websites
Dennis Milligan (R) for State Treasurer

Official Commissioner of State Lands campaign websites
Tommy Land (R) for Land Commissioner
Larry Williams (D) for Land Commissioner

 
Arkansas